Rode Jallewala is a village in the Firozpur district of Punjab, India. It is located in the Zira tehsil.

Demographics 
According to the 2011 census of India, Rode Jallewala had 298 households. The effective literacy rate (i.e. excluding children aged 6 and below) was 66.93%.

References 

Villages in Zira tehsil